Aaron Grant Buerge (born April 22, 1974) is an American banker, businessman and television personality. Buerge was known for the role in The Bachelor in 2002.

Early life 
On April 22, 1974, Buerge was born in Butler, Missouri. Buerge's parents are Alden and Kathryn Buerge.

Buerge is a graduate of Joplin High School.

Education 
Buerge has a Bachelor of science degree in Mechanical Engineering from University of Missouri-Rolla. Buerge has an MBA from Clemson University.

Career 
Since 2001, Buerge has been with First National Bank of Clinton. As of February 2018, Buerge is the Executive Vice President of Legacy Bank and Trust.

Buerge was cast as the Bachelor in the 2nd season of the series in 2002. He chose Helene Eksterowicz, and was engaged to her, but they called off their engagement after several weeks.

Buerge owned Trolley's Bar & Grille in Springfield, Missouri.

Awards 
 2016 40 Under 40 Yearbook.

Personal life 
On August 8, 2009, Buerge married Angye McIntosh, a commercial insurance agent, in Springfield, Missouri. Buerge has a step-daughter and two daughters.

See also 
 The Bachelor (season 2)

References

External links 
 
 Lawsuit forces Buerge bankruptcy (February 18, 2011)

1974 births
American bankers
American restaurateurs
Bachelor Nation contestants
Clemson University alumni
Living people
Missouri University of Science and Technology alumni
People from Butler, Missouri
People from Springfield, Missouri